First Independent Pictures (FIP) is an American motion picture distribution company.

History
First Independent Pictures was formed in 2004 as a distributor of high quality independent feature and documentary films.  In 2013, the company and its library was sold, and is now a division of Modern Media Company.

Titles in the company's library include Gigantic, Edmond, New York Doll, Big Fan,  and Holy Rollers.

References

Film distributors of the United States